50 & Counting was a concert tour by The Rolling Stones to celebrate the 50th anniversary of the band, which started in October 2012 (with two secret club gigs in Paris) and ended in July 2013 (with two major shows at Hyde Park).

History

2012 preliminary rehearsals and recording sessions
In late April / early May 2012, the band met up at a studio in Weehawken, NJ for some secretive, preliminary rehearsals (their first time playing together since 2007).

On 19 May 2012, Mick Jagger hosted and performed on the season finale of Saturday Night Live. The Rolling Stones then made their first public appearance in over four years on 11 July 2012 at the Marquee Club in London and the following day at Somerset House to commemorate the 50th anniversary of their first ever concert. They also published a book entitled The Rolling Stones: 50 as well as a documentary, Crossfire Hurricane, released on 15 November 2012 on HBO. The documentary included interviews from all six of the living band members.

In August 2012, the Stones gathered at a studio in Paris to record their first new material since A Bigger Bang.

2012 tour
In October and November 2012, they conducted rehearsals for their 50th anniversary concerts. The rehearsals for the 2012 tour took place in Bondy near Paris, France (in a rehearsal studio named Planet Live) and in London, England at the Wembley Arena for the 2012 shows. On 12 November 2012, they released GRRR!, a greatest hits compilation album that included the two new songs from the August recording sessions: "Doom and Gloom" (previously released as a single on 11 October 2012) and "One More Shot".

On 15 October 2012, they announced their first shows: two at the O2 Arena in London on 25 & 29 November 2012, one at the Barclays Center in Brooklyn, NY on 8 December, and two at the Prudential Center in Newark, NJ on 13 & 15 December. The 15 December 2012 show was broadcast in pay-per-view in the United States and many other countries.

Guests were announced, including former members Bill Wyman and Mick Taylor at the two shows in London. At the first London show the band was joined by Mary J. Blige and Jeff Beck. For the second London show, Eric Clapton and Florence Welch appeared. The guests for the Brooklyn show were Mary J. Blige and Gary Clark, Jr. Mick Taylor appeared at both Newark shows. John Mayer performed at the first Newark show, while Bruce Springsteen, Lady Gaga and The Black Keys were the guests at the second night in Newark.

The Rolling Stones played two secret shows in Paris in October 2012. They also participated on 12 December 2012 in the 12-12-12: The Concert for Sandy Relief performing a brief set of "You Got Me Rocking" and "Jumpin' Jack Flash".

2013 tour
On 3 April 2013, through their website, they announced more concerts as part of the 50 & Counting tour: a Spring 2013 North American tour of 18 arena concerts with the addition of a surprise club show at the Echoplex in Los Angeles, CA on 27 April 2013 where they were rehearsing. Prior to the announcement, the Associated Press compiled a list of five "reasons to care" about the pending tour by the "legendary band".

The rehearsals for the 2013 tour took place in Burbank, United States at Center Staging for the 2013 shows.

Katy Perry performed as guest star on May, 11 in Las Vegas, while Taylor Swift was guest on the 3 June concert in Chicago. After the last American concert on 24 June at the Verizon Center in Washington, D.C., the Stones returned to England to headline the Glastonbury Festival on 29 June, the band's first time ever participation in the festival.

On 6 & 13 July, they performed two shows at Hyde Park, 44 years after the 1969 performance and 51 years after their first ever gig (12 July 1962) at the Marquee Club then situated on Oxford Street, only a mile from the Hyde Park venue.

After the second Hyde Park concert, the band had a birthday celebration for Mick Jagger who turned 70 on 26 July 2013. The two Hyde Park shows were used for the live album Hyde Park Live as well as the concert film Sweet Summer Sun: Live in Hyde Park released 11 November 2013.

2014 tour
On 3 December 2013, The Rolling Stones announced the 14 On Fire tour, a follow-up to the 50 & Counting tour, due to start in February 2014 and visit the Middle East and Asia, Europe in summer 2014, and Australia in the fall 2014.

Set list
This set list is representative of the show on 3 May 2013. It does not represent all concerts for the duration of the tour.

 "Get Off of My Cloud"
 "The Last Time"
 "It's Only Rock 'n Roll (But I Like It)"
 "Paint It Black"
 "Gimme Shelter"
 "Wild Horses" 
 "Factory Girl"
 "Emotional Rescue"
 "Respectable" 
 "Doom and Gloom"
 "One More Shot"
 "Honky Tonk Women"
 "Before They Make Me Run"
 "Happy"
 "Midnight Rambler"
 "Miss You"
 "Start Me Up"
 "Tumbling Dice"
 "Brown Sugar"
 "Sympathy for the Devil"

Encore
 "You Can't Always Get What You Want"
 "Jumpin' Jack Flash"
 "(I Can't Get No) Satisfaction"

Tour dates

Personnel
The Rolling Stones
 Mick Jagger – lead vocals, guitar, harmonica, percussion, keyboards
 Keith Richards – guitars, vocals
 Charlie Watts – drums
 Ronnie Wood – guitars

Special guests
 Mick Taylor – guitars
 Bill Wyman – bass guitar

Additional musicians
 Bernard Fowler – backing vocals, percussion
 Lisa Fischer – backing vocals, percussion
 Darryl Jones – bass guitar, backing vocals
 Bobby Keys – saxophone
 Chuck Leavell – keyboards, backing vocals, percussion
 Tim Ries – saxophone, keyboards

Boxscore
Top 100 North American Mid Year Tours 2013: #1
Total Gross: US$87.7 million
Total Attendance: 253,296
No. of concerts: 18

See also
 The Rolling Stones concerts

Notes

References

External links
 The Rolling Stones (Official site)

The Rolling Stones concert tours
2012 concert tours
2013 concert tours